Irruppam Veedu Sasidaran (28 March 1947 – 24 October 2017), better known as I. V. Sasi, was an Indian film director who made over 110 films predominantly in Malayalam, in addition to Tamil and Hindi languages. In 2015, he was awarded the J. C. Daniel Award, the highest award in Malayalam cinema. Often described as a pathbreaker, Sasi made his mark during Malayalam cinema’s transformative period from the 1970s to 1990s.

Early and personal life

I. V. Sasi was born on 28 March 1947 in West Hill near Kozhikode, as the son of I. V. Chandran and Kausalya. He married Malayalam film actress Seema on 28 August 1980. He met her on the set of his film Avalude Ravukal. Ever since, she has been his favorite heroine. They have worked together in more than 30 movies. He has two children, daughter Anu and son Ani. Anu has acted in Symphony, directed by her father. Anu married Milan Nair on 10 December 2010. Ani completed Visual Communication from Loyola College, Chennai and is a budding director himself. He was the co-writer, along with Priyadarshan, for the epic movie Marakkar Arabikadalinte Simham. I. V. Sasi lived with his family in Chennai.

Career

I. V. Sasi started his film career as an art director. Later, after working as an assistant director in some films, he directed his first film at the age of 28. Though his name was not mentioned in the credits, the film turned out to be a huge success. He started his directorial career officially with his first film Ulsavam. Soon he carved out a name for himself in the Malayalam film industry. His films were known for their uniqueness and always contained a stamp of his directorial style. I. V. Sasi has directed more than 170 odd films over a span of 34 years and has constantly delivered super hits and some of them classified as classics or good cinema. His Malayalam film Avalude Raavukal permanently established his name in the industry. This film was later dubbed into many other Indian languages including Hindi. It was the second film in Malayalam to be rated as "Adults only" even though it was a drama.

I. V. Sasi introduced actor Mammootty as a hero in his film Thrishna. Mammootty-I. V. Sasi combination was one of the most successful and bankable ones in Malayalam cinema. One of Mohanlal's first breaks as a co-hero Ineyengillum was also directed by I. V. Sasi. He also introduced actor Jose. His collaborations with writers such as M.T. Vasudevan Nair, Padmarajan, and T.Damodaran are well remembered. He worked with Mammootty on more than 35 films. He went on to direct one of Mohanlal's biggest hits, Devaasuram, which was scripted by Ranjith. He has directed films in several other languages, such as Hindi, Telugu, and Tamil. He has directed Kamal Haasan in films like Guru, Allauddinum Arputha Vilakkum, Karishma and Eeta. He introduced Rajinikanth to Malayalam film industry with Allauddinum Albhutha Vilakkum (1979), and also made the Telugu-Tamil bilingual film Kaali with Rajinikanth in the lead role. He has directed Hindi movies as Patita (Mithun Chakraborty), Anokha Rishta (Rajesh Khanna and Smita Patil), Pratishodh (1980), Karishma etc. His most critically acclaimed Hindi film was Anokha Rishta with Rajesh Khanna in the lead which was remake of his Kanamarayathu. His biggest blockbuster in Tamil was Ore Vaanam Ore Bhoomi starring K. R. Vijaya, Seema and Jaishankar in 1979, which was remade in Malayalam as Ezhamkadalinakkare.

He has directed Malayalam movies in many genres. His war-themed movie 1921, written by screenwriter T. Damodaran, was the first Malayalam movie to be nominated in the Italian Film Festival. His Ina was the first Malayalam film about child marriage. In 1982, he shared The National film Awards' The Nargis Dutt award for the Best Feature Film on National Integration for his film Aaroodam with its producer Rosamma George. Ezhamkadalinakkare is the first Malayalam film to shoot in North America, with Manhattan being one of its locations. The song Suralokajaladhaara was filmed near in Niagara Falls, Ontario, Canada.

At the time of his death, he was working on pre-production of Burning Wells, a film based on the Kuwait war, which he was to co-direct with Sohan Roy.

Death

I. V. Sasi died at his home in Saligramam, Chennai on 24 October 2017 at the age of 70 at 10:30 am, due to a massive heart attack. He suffered from various ailments during his final years, like diabetes and high blood pressure. He survived a major stroke in 2006 and was undergoing treatment for cancer at the time of his death. He was cremated with full state honours at Chennai Porur Crematorium.

Filmmaking
Known for technical brilliance and stylish making, I.V. Sasi is considered as the director who introduced larger canvases and vibrant narrative terrains in Malayalam cinema that were populated by the rustic and the ordinary and not by ideal and romantic. Most of his works were blended with artistic elements and commercial values. His stories were said to have charged with sensuality and a visual feel. Some of these were mostly set in a atmosphere with strong female presences. The characters in his films came from all kinds of backgrounds and some of these represented the emerging demands and desires of Kerala’s civil society.

Awards
National Film Awards
 1982: Nargis Dutt Award for Best Feature Film on National Integration – Aaroodam

Kerala State Film Awards
 1976: Best Art Director – Anubhavam
 1984: Second Best Film – Aalkkoottathil Thaniye
 1988: Best Popular Film – 1921
 1989: Best Director – Mrigaya
 2014: J. C. Daniel Award

Filmfare Awards South
 1977: Best Director – Malayalam – Itha Ivide Vare
 1978: Best Director – Malayalam – Eetta
 2015: Lifetime Achievement Award

Selected filmography

Malayalam

Utsavam (1975)
Anubhavam (1976)
Aalinganam (1976)
Ayalkari (1976)
Abhinandanam (1976)
Aasheervaadam (1977)
Anjali (1977)
Akale Aakaasham (1977)
Angeekaaram (1977)
Abhinivesham (1977)
Itha Ivide Vare (1977)
Aa Nimisham (1977)
Aanandam Paramaanandam (1977)
Anthardaaham (1977)
Hridayame Sakshi (1977)
Innale Innu (1977)
Oonjaal (1977)
Ee Manohara Theeram (1978)
Anumodanam (1978)
Avalude Ravukal (1978)
Amarsham (1978)
Ithaa Oru Manushyan (1978)
Vadakakku Oru Hridayam (1978)
Njan Njan Mathram (1978)
Eeta (1978)
Iniyum Puzhayozhukum (1978)
Allauddinum Albhutha Vilakkum (1979)
Manasa Vacha Karmana (1979)
Anubhavangale Nanni (1979)
Ezhamkadalinakkare (1979)
Aarattu (1979)
Ivar (1980)
Angaadi (1980)
Kaanthavalayam (1980)
Karimpana (1980)
Meen (1980)
Ashwaradham (1980)
Orikkal Koodi (1981)
Thushaaram (1981)
Thrishna (1981)
Hamsa Geetham (1981)
Ahimsa (1981)
Ee Naadu (1982)
Ina (1982)
Thadakam (1982)
John Jaffer Janardhanan (1982)
Sindoora Sandhyakku Mounam (1982)
Innallenkil Naale (1982)
America America (1983)
Iniyengilum (1983)
Naanayam (1983)
Kaikeyi (1983)
Aaroodam (1983)
Uyarangalil (1984)
Athirathram (1984)
Lakshman Rekha (1984)
Aalkkoottathil Thaniye (1984)
Adiyozhukkukal (1984)
Aksharangal (1984)
Kanamarayathu (1984)
Rangam (1985)
Anubandham (1985)
Angadikkappurathu (1985)
Idanilangal (1985)
Karimbinpoovinakkare (1985)
Abhayam Thedi (1986)
Koodanayum Kattu (1986)
Vartha (1986)
Aavanazhi (1986)
Ithrayum Kalam (1987)
Adimakal Udamakal (1987)
Vrutham (1987)
Nalkavala (1987)
Abkari (1988)
Anuragi (1988)
1921 (1988)
Mukthi (1988)
Aksharathettu (1989)
Mrigaya (1989)
Varthamanakaalam (1990)
Arhatha (1990)
Midhya (1990)
Bhoomika (1991)
Inspector Balram (1991)
Neelagiri (1991)
Kallanum Polisum (1992)
Apaaratha (1992)
Devasuram (1993)
Padhavi (1993)
Arthana (1993)
The City (1994)
Varnapakittu (1997)
Anubhoothi (1997)
Aayiram Meni (1999)
Sradha (2000)
Aabharanacharthu (2002)
Ee Naadu Innale Vare (2002)
Symphony (2003)
Balram vs Tharadas (2006)
Vellathooval (2009)

Tamil
Allauddinum Arputha Vilakkum (1979)
Pagalil Oru Iravu (1979)
Ore Vaanam Ore Bhoomi (1979)
Guru (1980)
Kaali (1980)
Illam (1987)
Kolangal (1995)

Hindi
Patita (1980)
Karishmaa (1984)
Anokha Rishta (1986)

Telugu
Kaali (1980)
Guru (1980)
Manchi Varu Maavaru (1989)

References

External links
 
 The Hindu Friday Review – 
 IV Sasi at MSI

1948 births
2017 deaths
J. C. Daniel Award winners
Kerala State Film Award winners
Filmfare Awards South winners
Directors who won the Best Film on National Integration National Film Award
Malayalam film directors
Artists from Kozhikode
People from Kozhikode district
20th-century Indian film directors
21st-century Indian film directors
Film directors from Kerala
Tamil film directors
Hindi-language film directors
Film producers from Kerala